One and done may refer to:
One and Done (EP), by the American hard rock band Halestorm
One & Done (film), about Australian basketball player Ben Simmons

See also
 One-and-done rule, basketball rule whereby players are eligible for the NBA draft after playing in college for one year